Route 92 is a highway in Platte and Clay counties in northwestern Missouri, United States. Its western terminus is a continuation of K-92 on the Centennial Bridge over the Missouri River at the Kansas state line, and the eastern terminus is at U.S. Route 69 in northern Excelsior Springs.

Route 92 is one of the original 1922 state highways. Its eastern terminus was south of Smithville and was later extended east.

Major intersections

See also

References

External links

092
Transportation in Platte County, Missouri
Transportation in Clay County, Missouri